Lakeport is a neighborhood in the city of Laconia in Belknap County, New Hampshire, in the United States. It was once known as "Lake Village" and is centered on a power dam on the short river channel between Paugus Bay (an arm of Lake Winnipesaukee) to the north, and Opechee Bay to the south.

During the summer months the Lakeport train station is the southern destination of the Winnipesaukee Scenic Railroad. Trains are boarded at Weirs Beach or Meredith to the north.

Once a busy center for entertainment, the business area of Lakeport now consists of a couple of convenience stores, several restaurants, a large hotel on Opechee Bay, a small post office, and other small businesses. Over the past few years projects to revitalize the area have included redesign of the main intersection, replacement of the Lakeport Bridge, new plantings and foot bridges for pedestrians. Such projects have encouraged new business growth and investment to include lodging, dining, and various other services.

There are two free public parks that have been rebuilt over the last couple of years and have new playground equipment.  There are also several boat launches and marinas on the Paugus Bay side of Lakeport.

Climate

According to the Köppen Climate Classification system, Lakeport has a warm-summer humid continental climate, abbreviated "Dfb" on climate maps.

References

External links
Lakeport Community Association

Unincorporated communities in New Hampshire
Laconia, New Hampshire